Bethel Methodist Episcopal Church, also known as the Bethel Church, is a historic Methodist Episcopal church located at Harrison Township, Wells County, Indiana.  It was built in 1900, and is a two-story, irregular plan, Romanesque Revival style brick building.  It is topped by hipped and gable roof masses.  It features a three-story bell tower at the main entrance.

It was listed on the National Register of Historic Places in 1984.

References

Methodist churches in Indiana
Churches on the National Register of Historic Places in Indiana
Romanesque Revival architecture in Indiana
Churches completed in 1900
Buildings and structures in Wells County, Indiana
National Register of Historic Places in Wells County, Indiana
1900 establishments in Indiana